Kozhi Koovuthu is a 2012 Indian film directed by K I Ranjith. The film features Ashok alongside Shija Rose, Bose Venkat  and Rohini.

Plot
Kumaresan (Ashok) and his gang of friends go around villages selling chickens. They con the simple villagers into believing that the common chickens they sell are imported breeds. The whole group is happy-go-lucky, and they do not worry much about the future. Thulasi (Sija Rose), who is living at her aunt's house after moving away from her father, buys two chicks from Kumaresan. When they end up dead the next day, she corners him and demands an explanation. Kumaresan gives two more chicks as replacement. Later, when a group of villagers tie up Kumaresan and beat him for cheating them by selling them sick chicken, Thulasi saves him from the group. On learning of Kumaresan's family and the hardships that he has faced, she develops a soft corner for him. In due course, this turns to love. Just as everything is progressing smoothly, Thulasi's ruffian uncle whisks her off to her native village for a festival, which later forms the crux of the story.

Cast
 Ashok as Kumaresan
 Sija Rose as Thulasi
 Bose Venkat as Aiyyanar
 Rohini as Valliammai
 Sujatha Sivakumar
 Aadukalam Naren
 Mayilsamy

Production
After nearly four years of pre-production, the film was shot over nine months beginning in 2011. The film's background score and soundtrack was composed by E. S. Ramraj, while cinematography is handled by A. Jeyaprakash.

Soundtrack
Soundtrack was composed by E. S. Ramraj.
"Vaadamallikari" - Karthik, Anuradha Sriram
"Saara Paambu" - ES Ramraj, H Priya
"Yaaro Nee" - Swetha Mohan
"Ellarum Otha Saanu" - M. S. Viswanathan, Aneesh VM
"Kaatraga En" - Shankar Mahadevan

Reception
The Times of India wrote "It is only thanks to the work put in by the lead pair and character actor Bose Venkat that there is some interest in the proceedings, though the characters and situations are fairly predictable". The Hindu wrote "The story is predictable — right from the start till the end — and therefore completely lacks the element of surprise. However, what the movie lacks by way of suspense, it makes up for with neat performances from its cast".

References

External links
 
Tamiltvshows.net
Gallery.oneindia.in

2012 films
2010s Tamil-language films
Indian romance films
2012 directorial debut films
2012 romance films